Hojatollah Khatib was the chairman of famous multisport club Persepolis Athletic and Cultural Club  based in Tehran, Iran between July 2004 and December 2005.
He died on 26 April 2015.

References

Iranian businesspeople
Iranian football chairmen and investors
2015 deaths
1954 births